North Salem High School may refer to:

North Salem Middle/High School, North Salem, New York
North Salem High School (Salem, Oregon)